Scinax staufferi is a species of frog in the family Hylidae.
It is found in Belize, Costa Rica, El Salvador, Guatemala, Honduras, Mexico, and Nicaragua.
Its natural habitats are subtropical or tropical dry forests, subtropical or tropical moist montane forests, moist savanna, subtropical or tropical seasonally wet or flooded lowland grassland, freshwater marshes, intermittent freshwater marshes, pastureland, rural gardens, heavily degraded former forest, ponds, and canals and ditches.

References

staufferi
Amphibians described in 1865
Taxonomy articles created by Polbot